The men's 110 metres hurdles at the 2018 European Athletics Championships took place at the Olympic Stadium on 9 and 10 August.

Records

Schedule

Results

Round 1

First 4 in each heat (Q) and the next fastest 5 (q) advance to the Semifinals. 11 fastest entrants awarded bye to Semifinals.

Wind:Heat 1: +1.8 m/s, Heat 2: +1.8 m/s

Semifinals

First 2 (Q) and next 2 fastest (q) qualify for the final.

Wind:Heat 1: 0.0 m/s, Heat 2: +0.8 m/s, Heat 3: -0.1 m/s

*Athletes who received a bye to the semifinals

Final
Wind: 0.0 m/s

References
110m  hurdles Men European Athletic Association

Hurdles 110 M
Sprint hurdles at the European Athletics Championships